Inside You is the 20th album by The Isley Brothers released on T-Neck Records on December 1, 1981.

The album was remastered and expanded for inclusion in the 2015 released CD box set The RCA Victor & T-Neck Album Masters, 1959-1983.

Reception

The title track was one of their notable hits in the beginning of the 1980s though it didn't return the Isley Brothers to their past glory. The older and younger Isleys, in the meantime, were arguing over the group's direction. Disagreements would eventually lead to an implosion in the 3 + 3 lineup.

Track listing

Personnel
The Isley Brothers
 Ronald Isley - lead vocals
 Rudolph Isley, O'Kelly Isley - background vocals
 Ernie Isley - lead and rhythm guitars, percussion and drums 
 Marvin Isley - bass, percussion
 Chris Jasper - all keyboards, percussion, vibes, string and horn arrangements

Guest Musicians
 Everett Collins - drums 
 Kevin Jones - congas, percussion
 Gene Orloff – concertmaster 
 Marilyn Wright - violin 
 Harold Kohon - violin 
 Winteron Garvey - violin 
 Marvin Morgenstern - violin 
 Richard Young - violin 
 Anahid Ajemian - violin 
 Fred Buldrini - violin 
 Kermit Moore - cello 
 Johnathan Abramowitz - cello 
 Alfred V. Brown - viola 
 Julian C. Barber - viola 
 Gloria Agostini - harp 
 Eve Otto - harp 
 Guy Lumis - violin 
 Gerald Tarack - violin 
 Louann Montesi - violin 
 Fred Zlotkin - cello 
 Mitsue Takayama - viola 
 Mike Spengler, Pete Ramaglia – trumpet 
 Wayne A. Wofford – alto saxophone

Charts

Singles

References

External links
 The Isley Brothers-Inside You at Discogs

1981 albums
The Isley Brothers albums
T-Neck Records albums